This is a list of electoral results for the electoral district of Kimberley in Western Australian state elections.

Members for Kimberley

Election results

Elections in the 2020s

Elections in the 2010s

Elections in the 2000s

Elections in the 1990s

Elections in the 1980s

Elections in the 1970s

 Preferences were not distributed.

Elections in the 1960s

Elections in the 1950s 

 Preferences were not distributed.

Elections in the 1940s

Elections in the 1930s

Elections in the 1920s 

 Preferences were not distributed.

Elections in the 1910s

Elections in the 1900s

References

Western Australian state electoral results by district